The Gaon Album Chart is a record chart that ranks the best-selling albums and EPs in South Korea. It is part of the Gaon Music Chart which launched in February 2010. The data for the chart is compiled by the Ministry of Culture, Sports and Tourism and the Korean Music Content Industry Association based on weekly and monthly physical albums and digital sales by six major distributors: LOEN Entertainment, S.M. Entertainment, Sony Music Korea, Warner Music Korea, Universal Music and Mnet Media.

Overall, EXO-K's Overdose (korean ver) album was Gaon Album Chart best selling album of 2014, selling 385,047 copies. EXO sold South Korea best-selling album of 2014 with both standard Overdose (korean ver) and its reissue Overdose (chinese ver) album selling a total of 657,765 units overall. The group won Artist of The Year and Album of The Year at 2014 Mnet Asian Music Awards, Album of The Year (2nd Quarter) at 4th Gaon Chart Music Awards, Disk Daesang and Disk Bonsang at 29th Golden Disc Awards.

Weekly charts

Monthly charts

Notes

References

External links 
 Current Gaon Album Chart

2014
Korea, South albums
2014 in South Korean music